Hadfield is a town in the High Peak of Derbyshire, England, with a population at the 2021 Census of 6,763. It lies on the south side of the River Etherow, near to the border with Greater Manchester, at the western edge of the Peak District close to Glossop.

Geography
Hadfield is in the northwest of England, between Bottoms Reservoir and the Glossop Brook, on the southern side of the River Etherow valley, which is known as Longdendale.

History
Hadfield was part of the Manor of Glossop and, at the time of the Domesday survey,  belonged to William the Conqueror. King Henry I granted the land to William Peveril. In 1157, King Henry II gave it to the Abbey of Basingwerk. In 1537, King Henry VIII gave it to the Earl of Shrewsbury, from whom it came to the Howard family (Dukes of Norfolk). While the Howards were responsible in the 1810s for the development of Glossop, it was the Sidebottom family who developed Hadfield. They bought the Waterside and Bridge Mill complex from John Turner and John Thornley in 1820.

For three generations, they developed these mills as a large spinning and weaving combine. They built their own branch railway to the mill and, in 1880, ran 293,000 spindles and 4,800 looms. In 1896, the Sidebottoms went into liquidation. Bridge Mill was destroyed by fire in 1899, but Waterside Mill was bought by John Gartside and Co of Ashton-under-Lyne. Gartside's re-equipped the mills with automatic looms from the United States and installed new engines and electric lighting.

During the First World War (1914–18), the mill was taken over by the Greenfield Mill Company but parts of the mill were used to produce munitions. After the war, the company declined. In 1940, the mill was occupied by Maconochie's Foodstuffs Ltd, which had been bombed out of its previous premises in London. By 1954, about half of the original building had been demolished and more was to go. In 1976, the site was redeveloped and renamed as the Hadfield Trading Estate.

Station Mill was built in 1834 by Thomas and Edward Platt, members of a family who had farmed Longdendale for generations. The family owned this cotton mill for 68 years, before selling it in 1923 to E. Wilman & Sons, which converted it to silk noil spinning. The mill closed in 1989.

Hadfield Mills were corn mills from before 1819. In 1874, Thomas Rhodes and Sons converted the mills to the manufacture of cotton. A thousand workers were employed there in 1873, but it closed in 1932. In 1940, it was reopened by Hadfield Worsted Mills Ltd for cloth manufacture.

Hadfield and its mills were linked to Glossop via an electric tramway which operated between 1903 and 1927.

Governance
Hadfield is administered by High Peak Borough Council at the Town/District/Borough level of Government and by Derbyshire County Council at County level.

Representation on Derbyshire County Council is split between the divisions of Glossop and Charlesworth, and Etherow – with the majority of the town being in the Etherow division. The Etherow division contains Hadfield North, Hadfield South, Gamesley and the large and sparsely populated Tintwistle ward. The Glossop and Charlesworth division contains, amongst others, the Padfield ward (which takes the northern side of Station Road, the main shopping street). These boundaries were set in 2013.

Representation on High Peak Borough Council

Hadfield does not have a parish council.

The Member of Parliament for the High Peak constituency, since 2019, has been Robert Largan MP who represents the Conservative Party. His majority in the 2019 general election was 590 over the Labour candidate Ruth George.

Transport
Hadfield lies within close proximity of the county boundary with Greater Manchester and some services are provided with this in mind. Though lying within Derbyshire and the East Midlands, some of Hadfield's transport facilities are managed by Transport for Greater Manchester.

Railway

The town is served by Hadfield and Dinting railway stations, on the Glossop line. Hadfield is the terminus, with most trains running first to Glossop and then reversing back through Dinting towards Manchester Piccadilly. The railway, formerly known as the Woodhead Line, used to run through to Penistone and Sheffield, via the Woodhead Tunnel, but passenger services were withdrawn in 1970. Goods trains ran until 1981, when Hadfield became the terminus. The track to the east was lifted subsequently and has now been adopted as part of the Longdendale Trail footpath.

Roads
The A57, which links Manchester to Sheffield via the Snake Pass, passes to the south of Hadfield, from Woolley Bridge to Dinting Vale. The A628 road, from Manchester to Barnsley and Sheffield over the Woodhead Pass, runs on the other side of the River Etherow through Hollingworth and Tintwistle. These two roads are major freight routes and are often congested, which has created traffic problems both for Hadfield and the neighbouring towns and villages. The proposed Mottram to Tintwistle by-pass is intended to relieve the congestion.

Buses
Bus services in the area are operated by Stagecoach Manchester and High Peak Buses. The town is served by three main bus routes:
 237, which runs twice per hour in each direction towards Glossop and Ashton-under-Lyne
 341, which runs hourly to both Glossop and Hyde
 393, which is an hourly circular route linking the town to Padfield, Glossop and Shirebrook Park.

Media

The popular BBC television comedy series The League of Gentlemen was filmed in Hadfield, which doubled as the fictional town of Royston Vasey.  In the film spin-off from the original series, The League of Gentlemen's Apocalypse, Hadfield appears as itself when the characters from the TV series enter into the real world through a supposed portal below a church.  The statue featured in the series and film's opening credits is the war memorial, commemorating lives lost in the First and Second World Wars.

See also
Listed buildings in Hadfield, Derbyshire

References

Towns in Derbyshire
Towns and villages of the Peak District
Glossop